North Kessock (Gaelic: Ceasag a Tuath or Aiseag Cheasaig) is a village on the Black Isle north of Inverness.

Description
North Kessock is the first village encountered over the Kessock Bridge. Now bypassed by the main road to the north (the A9), the village remains quiet. Its counterpart across the Beauly Firth, South Kessock, is a district of Inverness.

History
North Kessock probably existed as early as 1437, when the Dominican monastery in Inverness was granted a charter to operate a ferry to the Black Isle. This was on the pilgrim route north to St Duthac Church in Tain.

Recently the community has been involved in a long running dispute over the location of glass recycling bins.  The matter was settled after a community ballot organised by Highland Council where 67% of those who responded voted to site the bins in the main car park.

Wildlife
North Kessock is a famous spot for watching bottlenose dolphins, which are resident in the Moray Firth – indeed they are the most northerly group of bottlenose dolphins in the world.

See also 
 Clootie well

Footnotes

Populated places on the Black Isle